is a Japanese racewalking athlete. Representing Japan at the 2019 World Athletics Championships, she placed seventh in the women's 20 kilometres walk.

References

Japanese female racewalkers
1999 births
Living people
World Athletics Championships athletes for Japan
Athletes (track and field) at the 2020 Summer Olympics
Olympic athletes of Japan
21st-century Japanese women